The Bremen City School District is a public school district in Haralson County, Georgia, United States, based in Bremen. It serves Bremen and the 1/3 of its students who reside out side of the city limits.

Schools
The Bremen City School District has three elementary schools, one middle school, and one high school.

Elementary schools
Bremen 4th/5th Academy
Crossroad Academy
Jones Elementary

Middle school
Bremen Middle School

High school
Bremen High School

See also
Haralson County School District

References

External links
Bremen City School District

School districts in Georgia (U.S. state)
Education in Haralson County, Georgia